Brizgaaaaj! was the debut album of Slovenian pop folk band Atomik Harmonik. The lead single, "Brizgalna brizga", was a summer hit in Slovenia in the summer of 2004, and the album was released the following November. It was the number one album in Slovenia for 16 weeks. In 2005 the band released a second single, "Na seniku".

On 15 November 2005, Menart Records reissued the album as an enhanced CD. The reissue, called Brizgaaaaj! Še več in dlje!, included a new single called "Turbo Polka", music videos for all three singles, and two additional remixes. "Turbo Polka" is an English-language version of "Brizgalna brizga" intended for an international market. It reached number 34 in the German record charts, and peaked at number 64 in Austria. The  music video for "Brizgalna brizga" was directed by Jani Pavec.

Track listing

References

External links
 

Atomik Harmonik albums
2004 albums